Dobson High School is a public high school located in Mesa, Arizona, United States. It is one of six high schools in Mesa Public Schools and serves grades 9-12. Rhodes and Summit Academy feed students into Dobson. The school's mascot is a Mustang and the school colors are royal blue and silver.

The school is named after the Dobson family, who moved to the area in 1886 and established a large ranch which includes the land where the school is now located.

In the 1986-87 school year, it was honored as a Blue Ribbon school.

In 2009, President Barack Obama made a speech at the school, announcing a mortgage relief plan.

Two episodes of MTV's Made have been filmed on campus.

The current principal is Gabrielle Buckley. Four assistant principals, Adam Malik, Patrick Bass, Christina R. Sweador, and Scott Mohn, comprise the rest of the administration.

Demographics 
During the 2020-2021 school year, the demographic break of the 2,286 students enrolled was:

 Male - 51%
 Female - 49%
 Native American/Alaskan - 5.2%
 Asian - 1.3%
 Black - 6.6%
 Hispanic - 52.7%
 Native Hawaiian/Pacific Islander - 1.5%
 White - 30.3%
 Multiracial - 2.4%

Athletics 
Offered Athletics:

 Badminton
 Cross Country
 Football
 Pom & Cheer
 Beach Volleyball
 Swim & Dive
 B/G Golf
 B/G Volleyball
 B/G Basketball
 B/G Soccer
 B/G Tennis
 Wrestling
 Baseball
 Softball
 Track & Field
 JROTC

Feeder Schools 
Junior High Schools that feed into Dobson High School include:

 Carson Junior High School
 Kino Junior High School
 Rhodes Junior High School
 Summit Academy (IB Program)

Notable alumni

1985: Paul Swingle, former MLB player (California Angels)
1986: Marianne Dissard, singer and filmmaker
1993: Jake Bell, author
2000: Nick DeWitz, professional basketball player
2000: Chez Reavie, professional golfer (2x PGA Tour winner)
2007: Mickey McConnell, professional basketball player
2010: Julie Johnston, defender for the United States women's national soccer team (did not play soccer at Dobson)

References 

Educational institutions established in 1981
Public high schools in Arizona
High schools in Mesa, Arizona
Schools in Maricopa County, Arizona
1981 establishments in Arizona